Still Breathing is a 1997 drama film directed by James Ford Robinson and starring Brendan Fraser and Joanna Going.

Plot
Con artist Rosalyn Willoughby (Going) in Hollywood and puppeteer Fletcher McBracken (Fraser) in San Antonio have the same dream, which links them to each other. He travels to L.A. to find her, but at first she resists him. The film is set in Los Angeles, California, San Antonio, and San Marcos, Texas.

Cast
Lou Rawls as The Tree Man
Brendan Fraser as Fletcher McBracken
Joanna Going as Rosalyn Willoughby
Steven Lambert as Man in Alley
Chao Li Chi as Formosa Bartender
Ann Magnuson as Elaine
Paolo Seganti as Tomas De Leon
Wendy Benson-Landes as Brigitte
AJ Mallett as Little Boy in Dream
Katie Hagan as Little Girl in Dream
Celeste Holm as Ida, Fletcher's Grandmother
Toby Huss as  Cameron
Jeff Schweickert as Slammin' Sammy
Bill Gundry as Man With Painting
Angus Macfadyen as Philip
Liz Mamana as Slightly Elegant Girl

Release
The film premiered at the South By Southwest Film Festival on March 15, 1997.  The film was later screened at festivals in Chicago and Montreal that same year, before receiving an American theatrical release on May 1, 1998.

References

External links
 Official Website
 
 
 Amazon.com listing
 
 

1997 films
1998 films
American romantic comedy-drama films
1990s romantic comedy-drama films
Puppet films
Films set in Los Angeles
Films set in San Antonio
Films shot in Texas
1997 comedy films
1998 comedy films
Films about con artists
Films about dreams
1990s English-language films
1990s American films